Umesh Bhat Bhavikeri was an Indian politician belonging to Indian National Congress. He was elected as a member of Karnataka Legislative Assembly from  Ankola in 1989. He also served as the Chairman of Lok Shiksha Trust. It publishes a Kannada newspaper the Samyukta Karnataka.

Position held

Death
He died of a heart attack on 13 August 2019 at the age of 72.

References

1940s births
2019 deaths
Indian National Congress politicians from Karnataka
Karnataka MLAs 1989–1994